Lars "Lasse" Erik Oliver Lindroth  (born Cambiz Fachericia; 9 November 1972 – 11 July 1999) was an Iranian-Swedish  comedian, actor and writer.

Lindroth was born in Teheran, Iran, as Cambiz Fachericia, and was adopted by a Swedish family from Täby around the age of six months.

He became popular in Sweden as a comedian in the mid-1990s, under the stage name Ali Hussein. From there he went on to also write books and play parts in films and on TV. For example, he played in the TV series Sjukan, which was a Swedish version of British sitcom Only When I Laugh.

His Iranian origin allowed him to play on the prejudices about immigrants from different countries, while also making jokes about racists of all sorts. This made him unpopular in the nationalist movements.

He died in an automobile accident on E6 near Uddevalla  at 26 years of age.

Filmography
1995 - Sjukan (television)
1996 - Tratten och Finkel (television)
1997 - Sanning eller konsekvens
1997 - Beck – Pensionat Pärlan
1997 - Beck – Spår i mörker
1998 - Beck – Öga för öga
1998 - Beck – The Money Man

References

External links

1972 births
1999 deaths
Swedish people of Iranian descent
Swedish comedians
Road incident deaths in Sweden
People from Tehran
20th-century Swedish comedians